Rajbanshi, Rajbongshi, or Rangpuri may refer to:
 Rajbongshi people, an ethnic group of South Asia
 Rangpuri language or Rajbanshi language, their language

See also
Rangpur (disambiguation)

Language and nationality disambiguation pages